Rui André Oliveira Ramos (born 6 February 1995 in Valongo) is a Portuguese footballer who plays for Leixões S.C. as a midfielder.

Football career
On 17 August 2014, Rui André  made his professional debut with Leixões in a 2014–15 Segunda Liga match against Benfica B.

References

External links

Stats and profile at LPFP 

1995 births
Living people
Portuguese footballers
Association football midfielders
Liga Portugal 2 players
Leixões S.C. players